Deivi Anderson García (born May 19, 1999) is a Dominican professional baseball pitcher for the New York Yankees of Major League Baseball (MLB). He made his MLB debut in 2020.

Early life
García was born and grew up in Bonao, Dominican Republic. He has two older brothers. His father, a youth baseball coach, also coached García as a youngster. His mother, a doctor, set aside her career to raise their family.

Career
García signed with the New York Yankees in July 2015 for a $200,000 signing bonus. Though he previously played baseball as an infielder and an outfielder, the Yankees had him become a pitcher due to his throwing arm strength. In 2018, García pitched for the Charleston RiverDogs of the Class A South Atlantic League and the Tampa Tarpons of the Class A-Advanced Florida State League. He made his final start of the 2018 season with the Trenton Thunder of the Class AA Eastern League.

García returned to Tampa in 2019, and was promoted to Trenton after making four starts. In July he was selected to play in the All-Star Futures Game. After the game, he was promoted to the Scranton/Wilkes-Barre RailRiders of the Class AAA International League. Following the 2019 season, the Yankees added García to their 40-man roster to protect him from becoming eligible in the Rule 5 draft. García was named minor league pitcher of the year in the Yankees organization in 2019.

The Yankees sent García to their alternate training site to begin the 2020 season. He made his major league debut for the Yankees on August 30. He pitched six innings on 75 pitches, allowing four singles, one unearned run, no walks, and had six strikeouts in a no-decision. He had a 3–2 record with a 4.98 ERA in six starts during the 2020 season, and was an opener for Game 2 of the 2020 American League Division Series.
Only going one and half inning allowing a hit before being pulled for J. A. Happ.

García was optioned to Triple-A Scranton/Wilkes-Barre to begin the 2023 season.

References

External links

1999 births
Living people
Charleston RiverDogs players
Dominican Republic expatriate baseball players in the United States
Dominican Summer League Yankees players
Gulf Coast Yankees players
Major League Baseball pitchers
Major League Baseball players from the Dominican Republic
New York Yankees players
People from Bonao
Pulaski Yankees players
Scranton/Wilkes-Barre RailRiders players
Tampa Tarpons players
Tigres del Licey players
Trenton Thunder players